The Rutgers–UConn women's basketball rivalry is a rivalry between the UConn Huskies and Rutgers Scarlet Knights women's basketball programs.

History
As of March 2015, UConn leads the series 34–6, including 17 of the first 18 meetings between the two teams. When Rutgers joined the Big East Conference in 1995, the two teams met only once a year. The Connecticut Post describes Rutgers' first-ever win over UConn, a 74-70 win on February 10, 1998 at the Louis Brown Athletic Center, as the "catalyst in what has become a fierce rivalry." After the unranked Scarlet Knights nearly upset the then-undefeated Huskies on January 8, 2003, the two teams were scheduled to play twice during the 2003–04 regular season, and have done so every season since. While the Huskies would handily win the next three meetings, Rutgers finally broke through on February 18, 2005, as they defeated the Huskies for the first time in seven years, 76–62.

The rivalry had been partially fueled by an altercation that occurred between UConn head coach Geno Auriemma and former Rutgers player Cappie Pondexter after the 2005 Big East Tournament championship game. Auriemma reportedly made inappropriate remarks towards Pondexter, who retaliated by pointing her finger towards Auriemma. Big East Commissioner Michael Tranghese released a statement days later clearing Auriemma of any wrongdoing.

In recent years, the teams have met for games that included championship implications. On March 7, 2007, the Scarlet Knights won their first-ever Big East Tournament championship by beating the Huskies 55–47. However, on March 3, 2008, UConn would defeat Rutgers for the regular-season championship 66–46 and the Knights haven't beaten the Huskies since.

After Tennessee stopped scheduling Rutgers, the Connecticut Post said in 2008 that Connecticut had become Rutgers' biggest rival. Auriemma said about Rutgers, ""A lot of times, they talked like they were better than they were and that kind of caused a lot more of an intensity level than maybe there would have been with anyone else."

Game results

References

College basketball rivalries in the United States
UConn Huskies women's basketball
Rutgers Scarlet Knights women's basketball